Robert Gibb (born September 5, 1946) is an American poet.  Gibb won the 1997 National Poetry Series Open Competition for The Origins of Evening. It, along with his next two books, comprise what Gibb calls The Homestead Trilogy, a nearly 100-poem cycle probing the fading industrial history and culture of America's Steel City.

Life
He was born to a family of steelworkers in Homestead, Pennsylvania, a mill town six miles south of downtown Pittsburgh along the Monongahela River. The town was home to Andrew Carnegie's famous Homestead Steel Works and site of the infamous Homestead Strike.

Gibb earned a Bachelor of Fine Arts at Kutztown University in 1971, a Master of Fine Arts at the University of Massachusetts Amherst in 1974, and his Master of Arts and Ph.D. at Lehigh University in 1976 and 1986 respectively.

Works
 
 
 
 
 
 The Origins of Evening, poetry (New York: W. W. Norton, 1998)
 
 Momentary Days, poetry (Camden: Walt Whitman Center, 1989)
 
 Entering Time, Barnwood Press, poetry (Daleville: Barnwood Press, 1986)
 The Winter House, poetry (Columbia: University of Missouri Press, 1984)
 The Names of the Earth in Summer, poetry (Menemsha: Stone Country, 1983)
 The Margins, poetry (Menemsha: White Bear Books, 1979)

Anthologies

Reviews
Move over, John Edgar Wideman. Poet Robert Gibb's "The Homestead Trilogy," now completed, takes its place alongside "The Homewood Trilogy" in the canon of Pittsburgh literature. World Over Water concludes a fiercely ambitious cycle of Pittsburgh poems -- nearly 100 in all -- in the project Gibb began 10 years ago with "The Origins Of Evening," selected by Eavan Boland as winner of the 1997 National Poetry Series and published by Norton.

References

External links
 Contemporary Authors Online. The Gale Group, 2002. PEN (Permanent Entry Number):  0000128494.
 Peter Oresick (2007). Pittsburgh Post-Gazette: Review of World Over Water and "The Homestead Trilogy". Retrieved April 1, 2007.

External links
  The Burning World by Robert Gibb

1946 births
Living people
American male poets
Lehigh University alumni
University of Massachusetts Amherst alumni
Writers from Pittsburgh
People from Homestead, Pennsylvania
Kutztown University of Pennsylvania alumni
20th-century American poets
20th-century American male writers